Andrei Abraham (7 October 1916 – 20 February 1980) was a Romanian gymnast. He competed in the 1936 Summer Olympics.

References

1916 births
1980 deaths
Gymnasts at the 1936 Summer Olympics
Romanian male artistic gymnasts
Olympic gymnasts of Romania
Sportspeople from Cluj-Napoca